The Ultra Selection may refer to:

 The Ultra Selection (Mantronix album), 2005
 The Ultra Selection (Spandau Ballet album), 2005